Alyson Kay Wagner (born August 10, 1980) is an American sports broadcaster and retired soccer midfielder who last played for Los Angeles Sol of Women's Professional Soccer and the United States women's national soccer team. She is a two-time Olympic gold medalist and two-time FIFA Women's World Cup bronze medalist. She has worked for Fox Sports, CBS Sports and ESPN as a soccer analyst. She is the first woman to call a FIFA Men's World Cup game on U.S television, serving as the analyst alongside Derek Rae for Iran's 1–0 win against Morocco on June 15, 2018. She is also an owner of USL Championship club Queensboro FC.

Early life
Born and raised in San Jose, California, Wagner attended Hillbrook School, and later, Presentation High School and was a four-year varsity starter on the soccer team. She helped  the Panthers win the Central Coast Championship as a sophomore and senior. She was named CCS Player of the Year as a junior and senior and was selected as League MVP during her freshman, sophomore and junior years. As a senior, she was named NSCAA All-American, Parade All-American, Parade Magazine High School Player of the Year, and the Gatorade National High School Player of the Year. She was also named as the Northern California Student-Athlete of the Year and Presentation Scholar Athlete of the Year the same year.

Santa Clara Broncos, 1998–2002
Wagner began playing with the United States women's national soccer team in 1998, while still a freshman at Santa Clara University. She played in 23 games for the Broncos, starting 21, and scored 10 goals with 12 assists. She was named Second-Team NSCAA All-American, First-Team All-WCC and the WCC Freshman of the Year.

In 2001, she led Santa Clara to the NCAA Women's Soccer Championship, scoring the only goal in Santa Clara's 1–0 victory over perennial powerhouse North Carolina.

Wagner was awarded the 2002 Hermann Trophy as the top collegiate soccer player in the country and the Today's Top VIII Award as a member of the Class of 2002. She also won the Honda Sports Award as the nation's top soccer player.

Playing career

Club
Wagner was the number one pick at the 2003 WUSA Draft by the San Diego Spirit. The team finished in third place during the 2003 WUSA season with a  record. She played in all 20 matches during the season, scored two goals and recorded four assists. After advancing to the playoffs, the Spirit was defeated by the Atlanta Beat 2–1 in the semifinals with Wagner scoring the Spirit's lone goal. Wagner was named to the All-WUSA Second Team following the season.

At the conclusion of the 2003 season, Wagner was traded to the Boston Breakers, shortly before the WUSA suspended operations. She made her debut for the Breakers in a June 19, 2004 exhibition match against the Washington Freedom in Blaine, Minnesota.

In 2005, Wagner scored twice in three games for Olympique Lyonnais in the French First Division.

In 2009, Wagner began playing midfielder for the Los Angeles Sol of Women's Professional Soccer (WPS).

On January 14, 2010, Wagner announced her retirement from professional soccer due to injuries.

International
Wagner competed for the United States women's national soccer team from 1999 to 2008. She made appearances in 131 international matches, scored 21 goals and made 42 assists.

At the 2003 FIFA Women's World Cup in the United States, Wagner made four appearances including three group-stage matches and the semi-final match. In 2004, she was selected for the Athens Olympics. She played in four matches including three group-stage matches and the semi-final match, helping the U.S. win gold. On July 30, 2006, she became the 18th U.S. women's national team player to reach 100 caps during a friendly match against Canada.

In 2007, Wagner was selected by head coach Greg Ryan for the 2007 FIFA Women's World Cup in China and competed in the third-place play-off match against Norway.

Despite undergoing a double hernia operation in early 2008, Wagner was selected to play at the 2008 Summer Olympics and made one appearance as a substitute in a group-stage match against New Zealand.

International goals

Assists made in international matches
Wagner is among the top ten players of the United States women's national soccer team in providing assists. Wagner provided more assists than goals which is not unusual for a midfielder; however, a ratio of 42 assists to 21 goals is unmatched by any other player in the top ten assist providers of the United States women's national soccer team.

Personal life
In December 2006, Wagner married Adam Eyre, a former soccer player at Santa Clara University who played briefly for the New England Revolution of Major League Soccer. Wagner gave birth to triplet boys in August 2013  and a daughter in December 2015.

References

Match reports

External links

 
 
 
 
 Aly Wagner at NBC Olympics website 
 Fox Sports analyst profile

1980 births
Living people
American people of German descent
Olympic gold medalists for the United States in soccer
Footballers at the 2004 Summer Olympics
Footballers at the 2008 Summer Olympics
United States women's international soccer players
2003 FIFA Women's World Cup players
2007 FIFA Women's World Cup players
Women's United Soccer Association players
San Diego Spirit players
Santa Clara Broncos women's soccer players
Los Angeles Sol players
Olympique Lyonnais Féminin players
Expatriate women's footballers in France
American expatriate sportspeople in France
FIFA Century Club
Medalists at the 2008 Summer Olympics
Medalists at the 2004 Summer Olympics
Parade High School All-Americans (girls' soccer)
Soccer players from San Jose, California
Women's association football midfielders
American chief operating officers
American women business executives
American business executives
American women's soccer players
Women association football commentators
Division 1 Féminine players
Hermann Trophy women's winners
National Women's Soccer League commentators
Women's Professional Soccer players